The Walker River, New Zealand is a river in Southland, New Zealand. It rises near Cleughearn Peak and flows eastward into Lake Monowai.

See also
List of rivers of New Zealand

References

Rivers of Fiordland